Ben Hollingsworth may refer to:

 Ben Hollingsworth (soccer) (born 1982), American soccer player
 Ben Hollingsworth (actor) (born 1984), Canadian actor